One P.M. (alternately said to stand for One Pennebaker Movie or One Parallel Movie) is a 1972 film by documentary filmmaker D.A. Pennebaker, who had collaborated with Jean-Luc Godard on the unfinished film project One A.M. and had shared duties as cinematographer with Richard Leacock. Godard filmed One A.M. (One American Movie) in America in 1968.

References

External sources

1968 drama films
1968 films
1960s unfinished films
Films directed by Jean-Luc Godard